Buxton United FC is a Guyanese football club in Buxton. The club competes in the GFF Elite League, the top league of football in Guyana.

References

Football clubs in Guyana